The Roman Catholic Diocese of Xiangyang/Siangyang is a suffragan Latin diocese in the Ecclesiastical province of the Metropolitan Archbishopric of Hankou in central China, yet it depends on the missionary Roman Congregation for the Evangelization of Peoples.

Its episcopal see is located in the city of Xiangyang, Hubei. No statistics available.

Vacant since 1974, without Apostolic administrator.

History 
 Established on May 25, 1936 as Apostolic Prefecture of Xiangyang 襄陽, on territory split off from the then Apostolic Vicariate of Laohekou 老河口
 May 10, 1951: Promoted as Diocese of Xiangyang 襄陽

Ordinaries 
(Roman Rite) 

Apostolic Prefect of Xiangyang 襄陽 
 Francis Yi Xuan-hua (Yi Hsüan-hua) (易宣化) (born China) (May 25, 1936 – May 10, 1951 see below)

Suffragan Bishops of Xiangyang 
 Francis Yi Xuan-hua (Yi Hsüan-hua) (易宣化) (see above May 10, 1951 – death 1974).

See also 

 List of Catholic dioceses in China

References

Sources and external links 
 GCatholic.org - data for all sections
 Catholic Hierarchy

Roman Catholic dioceses in China
Religious organizations established in 1936
Roman Catholic dioceses and prelatures established in the 20th century
Religion in Hubei
Xiangyang